Controlled-access highways in Romania are dual carriageways, grade separated with controlled-access, designed for high speeds. There two types of highways, motorways and expressways, with the main difference being that motorways have emergency lanes and slightly wider lanes. There are no toll roads, but a road vignette is required.

The first construction works began in 1967, and the first highway segment was opened in 1972. However, extension of the high-speed road network lagged behind until after EU accession in 2007. Decreased corruption and improved utilization of the allocated EU funds in recent years, enabled Romania to speed up the expansion of its highway network.

Only A2 and A10 are completed, while A1 is mostly completed with all its remaining sections currently being built.  A3 has five segments that are currently in use, with most of the remaining ones being in various stages of construction or tendering.  A4, A6, A7 and A11 currently have only small segments in use. DEx12 was the first expressway to be opened in 2022. Construction contracts for all of A0 and A7, and part of A13, are in various stages of execution or tendering.

As of 15 December 2022, there are 994.605 km of highways in service, with another 450 km with signed contracts in various stages of execution, and another 350 km being tendered.

Legislation

In 2012, legislation amendments defined two types of highways: motorways and expressways. Motorways are identified by A followed by a number while expressways are identified by DEx followed by a number.

There are almost no tolls for using roads in Romania, with exception of large briges. There is one at the Giurgeni – Vadu Oii Bridge over the river Danube on highway DN2A at Vadu Oii and one at the Cernavodă Bridge, on the A2 motorway. Nevertheless, every owner of a car that uses a motorway (A), an expressway (DEx) or a national road (DN) in Romania must purchase a vignette (rovinietă) from any of the main petrol stations or at any post office throughout the country.

The main differences are that motorways have wide emergency lanes (3 m) and slightly wider traffic lanes (by 3.75 versus 3.5 m). Expressways only have a narrow 1.5 m gravel roadside on the right side, added to the 0.5 m asphalted road edges, and may not have acceleration and deceleration lanes in mountainous areas. Generally, feasibility studies for motorways have a minimum projected speed of 100 km/h, while for expressways, it is reduced to 80 km/h.

History

First projects

The construction of the first motorway in Romania began in 1967, and the first segment of the A1 motorway, from Pitești to the capital Bucharest was opened in 1972 with a total length of 96 km. During the building of this motorway, a general plan was released in 1969, detailing the building of motorways in the incoming years, however, due to low volumes of traffic, the communist regime focused on improving current roads instead. Until the collapse of the communist regime in 1989, the building of a second motorway between Bucharest and Constanța had been planned, but only an 18 km long segment of A2 from Fetești to Cernavodă opened in 1987.

In the 1990s, the transition from a centralized economy to a market economy severely limited investment into infrastructure projects, and the entire motorway network totaled 113 km for many years until the construction project of A2 was resumed in 1998. Actual construction began in 2001, and three segments were finally opened in 2004 (Bucharest – Fundulea – Lehliu – Drajna) and another in 2007 (Drajna – Fetești) totaling around 130 km. The A1 motorway was extended also in 2007 with the Pitești bypass. A large sector of A3, termed "Transylvania Motorway", was awarded controversially in 2004 without bidding to the American Bechtel Corporation. Large cost overruns and delays ensued for this project, and after political controversies, most of the contracts were cancelled, and only some 50 km of the Cluj bypass (Gilău – Turda – Câmpia Turzii) were opened between 2009 and 2010, at much larger costs than initially signed in the contract.

Accessing EU funds

After joining the European Union in 2007, Romania was able to access funds for infrastructure development more easily, especially for those part of the Pan-European Corridor IV overlapping with A1 and A2 motorways. Many segments of the A1 motorway were started, and by the end of 2011 around 85 km were partially or fully opened: A1 segments Timișoara – Arad and Sibiu bypass; A2 segment Murfatlar – Constanța; A4 Constanța bypass and A11 Arad bypass. In 2012 more segments were opened on A1 (Deva – Simeria), A2 (Cernavodă – Murfatlar),  A4, and the first A3 segment not built by  Bechtel (Bucharest – Ploiești). More segments were opened over the next few years: on A1 (part of Lugoj – Deva, Sibiu – Orăștie – Simeria, Arad – Nădlac, Timișoara – Lugoj),  A6 (Balinț – Lugoj), and A4. A total of 726.6 km of motorways were in use in Romania in December 2015.

Political debates and changes in priorities of left-leaning parties after 2014 greatly slowed down motorway projects. With no new openings in 2016, a small segment part of Lugoj – Deva opening in 2017, almost halt of the A10 (Aiud – Turda), and part of A3 (Ungheni – Iernut, Gilău – Nădășelu, and the entrance into Bucharest) brought the total to over 800 km at the end of 2018. Two more segments of the A1 opened in 2019 (between Coșevița and Deva), providing an almost fully opened motorway (excluding a segment of 13.5 km) between the border with Hungary and Sibiu. In 2020, more segments were opened, on A3 (Biharia − Borș, Iernut − Chețani, Râșnov − Cristian), on A10 (Sebeș – Alba Iulia), and the first segment of A7 (Bacău bypass) bringing the total to over 900 km of highways. In 2021, A10 completely opened (Alba Iulia – Aiud) and a segment of A3 (Târgu Mureș – Ungheni) opened to traffic. In 2022 the first segment of an expressway-class road in Romania open for traffic, the DEx12 expressway: between Balș and Slatina (16.0 km), and Slatina bypass.

Current projects

As of December 2022, over 450 km of controlled-access roads have contracted for construction. These contracts include: part of A3 (some 55.9 km), all segments of the A1 between Sibiu – Pitești (122.1 km), some 3/4 of A0 Bucharest Ring Motorway (74.6 km), as well as several segments of A7 (49.3 km). Contracts have been signed to complete the DEx12 expressway link to Craiova, and the A3 missing segment between Chețani – Câmpia Turzii (15.7 km) segment was resigned after a previous contract was cancelled at 40%.

Currently the only completed motorways are A2 and A10. The unfinished segments of A1 and A3 are in various stages of tendering and construction, with multiple segments likely to finish by 2022–2025.

A few more motorways have received active discussion, including the termed A0 Bucharest Motorway Ring Road as an outer ring to the Bucharest Ring Road, with construction contracts signed or tendered for all of its 100 km length. The A7 motorway, between Ploiești and the border with Ukraine, has been planned to be part of the Pan-European Corridor IX, but so far only the Bacău bypass has been built. However, PNRR funding is ensured for most of its segments, with tendering contracts existing for its first 320 km till Pașcani. Beyond Pașcani, the Corridor IX is envisioned to be covered by the A8 (the East–West Motorway, a link between Moldavia and Transylvania), with the first construction contracts expected to be signed in 2023.  Highways crossing the Carpathian Mountains have been delayed due to large costs, with debates on whether to build the A3 (through long-term concession contracts) or the A1 (EU funds would cover most of the cost). The A13 motorway is planned to serve as an alternative to link the A1 and the A3, then to the A7 near Bacău, with the first 65 km currently being tendered.

A9 is planned to link A1 to Serbia, with plans to sign the first construction contracts not earlier than 2023. Expressways extending the current A11 as well as the DEx6 linking Galați and Brăila are currently being constructed. Plans to extend the current network with expressways exist for A4, A5 (planned to link to Bulgaria), A6, and A14 corridors, as well as several other smaller ones.

Future timeline
Contracted segments with estimated openings:
2023
DEx4: Brăila - Jijila, section DN2B - DN22/link (7.955 km including Brăila Bridge) (2 phases Q2-Q4)
A3: Topa Mică - Suplacu de Barcău (3B), section 3B5 between Nușfalău - Suplacu de Barcău (13.554 km) (Q3)
DEx11 (16.035 km) overlapped with Oradea West Expressway (18.96 km): between Calea Borșului (DN1) - Biharia (A3) (11.28 km) (Q3)
A0: Bucharest North Ring, section 2 between Corbeanca - Afumați (19.0 km) (2 phases Q3-Q4); Bucharest South Ring, sections 1 and 2 between Căldăraru (A2) - Sintești (16.93 km) (Q4), and Sintești - Bragadiru (16.3 km) (Q4)
DEx12: Craiova - Pitești, section 3 between Valea Mare - Colonești (31.75 km) (Q4)
2024
A0: Bucharest North Ring, section 4 between Pantelimon (DN3) - Căldăraru (A2)(4.47 km); Bucharest South Ring, section 3 between Bragadiru - Bâcu (17.965 km)
A3: Gilău - Topa Mică (3A), section 3A2 between Nădășelu - Topa Mică (16.80 km);  Topa Mică - Suplacu de Barcău (3B), sections 3B1 and 3B2 between Topa Mică - Sutoru (13.26 km), and Sutoru - Poarta Sălajului (12.24 km);  Ogra - Câmpia Turzii, section 3 between Chețani - Câmpia Turzii (15.691 km)
A7: Ploiești (Dumbrava) - Buzău, sections 1, 2 and 3 between Dumbrava - Baba Ana (21.0 km), and Baba Ana - Stâlpu (28.35 km); section 3 (in auctions) Stâlpu - Buzău (13.9 km)
A7: Buzău - Focșani (Petrești), section 1, 2, 3 and 4 between Buzău - Vadu Pășii (4.6 km), Vadu Pășii - Râmnicelu (30.8 km), Râmnicelu - Milcovul (36.1 km) and Milcovul - Petrești (10.94 km)
DEx4: Brăila - Jijila, section DN22/link - Jijila (11.141 km)
DEx6: Brăila (DEx4) - Galați (10.763 km)
DEx11 (16.035 km) overlapped with Oradea West expressway (18.96 km): between Sântandrei - Calea Borșului (DN1)(4.75 km)
DEx12: Craiova - Pitești, sections 1 and 4 between Craiova - Spineni (17.7 km), and Colonești - Catanele (31.815 km)
2025
A1: Pitești - Sibiu, section 5 between Pitești - Curtea de Argeș (30.349 km)
A3: Suplacu de Barcău - Borș (3C), sections 3C1 and 3C2 between Suplacu de Barcău - Chiribiș (26.35 km), and Chiribiș - Biharia (28.55 km) 
A7: Focșani (Petrești) - Bacău, sections 1, 2, and 3 between Focșani (Petrești) - Domnești Târg (35.6 km), Domnești Târg  - Răcăciuni (38.78 km), and Răcăciuni - Bacău (21.522 km)
A7: Bacău - Pașcani, sections 1, 2, and 3 between Bacău - Trifești (30.3 km), Trifești  - Mircești (19.0 km), and Mircești - Pașcani (28.094 km)
2026
A1: Deva - Lugoj, section 2E between Holdea - Margina (9.13 km)
2027
A1: Pitești - Sibiu, sections 3 and 4 between Tigveni - Copăceni (37.4 km) and Curtea de Argeș - Tigveni (9.861 km)
2028
A1: Pitești - Sibiu, section 2 between Copăceni - Boița (31.33 km)

In total, some 580 km of highways and expressways are currently contracted with builder after tenders and appeals, to be built by 2028.

List

Expressways
In addition to the expressways listed in the main table above, several other expressways have been planned, but which are unlikely to be completed by 2030.

Gallery

See also
Transport in Romania
Roads in Romania
List of controlled-access highway systems
Evolution of motorway construction in European nations
European routes
List of roads and highways

References

External links
Romanian National Company of Motorways and National Roads
Interactive map of current motorway projects in Romania
130km.ro - news and updates (Ro)
 Community forum for status updates on the highways (Ro)
http://www.cnadnr.ro/sites/default/files/STADIULPROIECTELORINDERULARE.pdf

Lists of roads
Motorways in Romania
Roads in Romania
Expressways in Romania